Philipp Hainhofer (21 July 1578 – 1647) was a merchant, banker, diplomat and art collector in Augsburg. He is remembered, among other things, for the curiosity cabinets (Kunstschränke) which he created with the assistance of a large number of Augsburg artisans.

Hainhofer studied law at the Universities of Siena and Padua, traveled through Italy, Germany and the Netherlands, and acquired a good knowledge of art and several languages. He was elected to the senate of Augsburg in 1605 and was chosen as political correspondent in the city by the King of France, the Margrave of Baden and Duke Philip II of Pomerania. he last of these was of particular significance and Hainhofer acted as agent for the Duke in acquiring art and objects for a Kunstkammer (curiosity chamber), and in composing the famous so-called Pommerscher Kunstschrank (Pomeranian curiosity cabinet), which was made 1615-1617 and given as a gift to the Duke; it was destroyed in a fire during Berlin bombing campaign at the end of World War II. He is also known for building the first cuckoo clock in Black Forest, Germany.

Philip of Pomerania and other princes used Hainhofer for various diplomatic missions and the contacts Hainhofer made on his journeys also served to develop his business as an art agent, and he produced additional curiosity cabinets. In 1632, one was presented by Hainhofer on behalf of the City of Augsburg to King Gustavus Adolphus of Sweden. This cabinet, which is the best preserved of Hainhofer's Kunstschränke, is on display in the Museum Gustavianum of the University of Uppsala. Another one, made for Augustus, Duke of Brunswick-Lüneburg, is preserved in the Rijksmuseum in Amsterdam. Hainhofer also compiled an album amicorum containing signatures of many great names from across Europe which became known as Das Große Stammbuch and was eventually acquired by the Herzog August Library in Wolfenbüttel.

References
Oscar Doering, Biography in Allgemeine Deutsche Biographie, Bd 49, p. 719.

Further reading
 
 Jochen Brüning & Friedrich Niewöhner (eds.), Augsburg in der Frühen Neuzeit. Beiträge zu einem Forschungsprogramm (1995)

External links
Presentation and very large and detailed image of the cabinet made for Duke August of Brunswick-Lüneburg, at the Rijksmuseum.
The Augsburg Art Cabinet, about the Uppsala cabinet
The King's Kunstkammer, a Danish Internet exhibition on the idea behind renaissance art and curiosity chambers (text in English)
Pommerscher Kunstschrank
 J. Paul Getty Museum Augsburg Cabinet: 3-D model online interactive with high-resolution photography, description of subjects depicted, and mapping of exotic materials.

1578 births
1647 deaths
Businesspeople from Augsburg
German bankers
German diplomats
University of Siena alumni
University of Padua alumni